Robert August (born 1945) is an American surfer and surfboard shaper. Raised in Seal Beach, California,  he attended Huntington Beach High School where he was ASB President his senior year. He is most famous as one of the subjects of Bruce Brown's 1966 surf documentary The Endless Summer, along with his friend Mike Hynson. The film follows the two around the world pursuing their hobby during the California offseason, meeting other surfers and discussing surf culture.

August picked up surfing in the 1950s, when the sport's popularity had just begun to grow. His father, Blackie August, was also a noted surfer. His enthusiasm and his involvement in The Endless Summer influenced the growth of the sport over the following decades. His surfboards are sold under the Robert August Surfboards brand and are produced by Surftech, a company that manufactures lightweight epoxy surfboards. He continues to travel the world promoting surfing, and in 1994, he was involved in the filming of The Endless Summer II, in which surfers Pat O'Connell and Robert "Wingnut" Weaver retrace the places visited by August and Hynson thirty years earlier.
He took part in the film Step into Liquid.

Robert now (2022) lives in Tamarindo in Costa Rica. He still shapes boards and comments on The Endless Summer movie screening on Tuesday nights at Witches Rock surf school in tamarindo.  Ambassador Of Surfing at Witches Rock Surf Camp. He’s a friendly guy and easy to chat to.

References

Dixon, Drew (September 16, 2006). "Surf legend displays his timeless grace". The Florida Times-Union. Accessed October 3, 2006.

External links

1945 births
American surfers
Living people
Sportspeople from Orange County, California
Surfboard shapers
20th-century American people